
Year 145 BC was a year of the pre-Julian Roman calendar. At the time it was known as the Year of the Consulship of Aemilianus and Mancinus (or, less frequently, year 609 Ab urbe condita). The denomination 145 BC for this year has been used since the early medieval period, when the Anno Domini calendar era became the prevalent method in Europe for naming years.

Events 
 By place 
 Syria 
 In the Battle of Antioch, Ptolemy VI Philometor defeats the Seleucid usurper Alexander Balas, but dies in the battle.

 Egypt 
 Ptolemy VII becomes king of Egypt briefly, then is assassinated by Ptolemy VIII the following year.

 By topic 
 Astronomy 
 Hipparchus determines the length of the tropical year.

Births 
 Sima Qian, Chinese historian (or 135 BC) (d. 86 BC)

Deaths 
 Alexander Balas (assassinated)
 Ptolemy VI of Egypt (killed in battle) (b. c. 186 BC)

References